The Aerodrome was a nightclub located at 1588 State Street in Schenectady, New York.

The Aerodrome was established in 1967 by Jack Rubin of Chicago. The building was originally a 32-lane bowling alley named 'Woodlawn Lanes', which was converted by Rubin into a music venue. Its capacity was approximately 3,000 people.

Several famous rock bands and musicians performed at the Aerodrome, including Led Zeppelin,  Janis Joplin, Billy Joel, B.J. Thomas, The Electric Prunes, Vanilla Fudge, Three Dog Night, Jeff Beck Group (featuring a young Rod Stewart and Ronnie Wood), Chicago, The Yardbirds, BB King, and many more bands from that era.

Because of ill-health, Rubin closed the Aerodrome in 1972, and it was demolished.  The building was badly damaged from the vibration caused by the noise of the loud music.  This area now holds a newer building, Woodlawn Plaza.

A sampling of posters advertising AERODROME concerts:
Janis Joplin
The Electric Prunes

References

Former music venues in New York (state)
Music venues completed in 1967
Buildings and structures in Schenectady, New York

Aerodrome, Schenectady, NY
Aerodrome shows
Al Quaglieri compiled this roster of Aerodrome acts over 20 years of research.

1968

January 25 — The Box Tops, Luv Minus Zero [grand opening night]
March 14 — The YWCA Co-Ed Club dance
March 21 — The Aerodromes
March 22-23 — The Electric Prunes, Aerodrome
March 24 — The Electric Prunes performing “Mass In F Minor” [“guys, jackets a must!”]
March 28 — The Yardbirds, The Aerodromes
April 4 — The Aerodromes
April 5-6 — Ultimate Spinach & Aerodromes
April 7 — Aerodromes & Ultimate Spinach all ages
April 12-14 — The Beacon Street Union, The Aerodromes
April 18 — Aerodromes
April 19-21 — Aerodromes, Tyrolean Flower Act
April 25 — The Aerodromes, “Dating Game Night”
April 26-27 — Jimmy Angel with The Distant Sounds & Aerodromes
April 27 — Jaycees Battle of the bands [afternoon show]
April 28 1-7 — All teenagers Jimmy Angel with The Distant Sounds & Aerodromes
April 28 — The Yardbirds
May 2 — The Aerodromes
May 3-5 — The Hassles, The Aerodromes
May 9 — The Bougalieu
May 10-11 — Oxford Watch Band, East Coast Clique
May 12 — Oxford Watch Band
May 29 — High School Night (sponsored by the Schenectady Deanery Catholic Youth Organization)
May 30-June 1 — Burgundy Sunset, East Coast Recital
June 2 — Burgundy Sunset
July 5-6 — The Bougalieu, The Page One (Syracuse)
July 12-13 — The Bougalieu
July 19-20 — The Bougalieu
July 23 — Battle of the Bands: Tempered Blues, Love's Ice Cube, Second Level, Royal Blush, Mixed Emotions, Boston Tea Party, Men Form Sound, Strangers, Stained Glass Encyclopedia (benefit for the Eugene McCarthy-Paul O’Dwyer campaign)
July 29 — Wilmer Alexander Jr & The Dukes (benefit for the Eugene McCarthy-Paul O’Dwyer campaign)
July 31 — Steppenwolf; August 26 — Archie Bell & The Drells
August 30, 31 — Wilmer & The Dukes, Karyn
September 1 — The Doors [unconfirmed, also listed for September 2]
September 16 — Joe Tex
October 25-26 — The Fuzzy Bunnies

1969
March 28 — Johnnie Taylor
April 12 — Wilmer & The Dukes
May 10 — Peaches & Herb, Maurice & Earl, The Mark IV and David Ward
May 25 — Clarence Carter
July 3 — B.B. King
July 9 — The Jeff Beck Group
July 11 — The Lemon Pipers, Pacific Gas & Electric
July 16-17 — Majic Ship
July 18 — NRBQ, Majic Ship
July 19 — Johnnie Taylor
July 25 — The Buddy Miles Express, The Oz’n Ends
August 1 — The Oz’n Ends, Free
August 2 — Free
August 9 — Chicago Transit Authority, Spyder
August 14 — Wilmer & The Dukes
August 15-16 — JJ & The Impacts, NRBQ
August 20 — Led Zeppelin, Spyder, Last Thursday
August 23 — Jr. Walker & The All Stars
August 24 — The G.E. Pursuit of Happiness Show
September 19 — Canned Heat
September 20 — The Sam & Dave Revue
September 26 — Velvet Underground
October 10 — Canned Heat
November 7 — Tim Hardin
November 26 — Country Joe & The Fish
Dec 6 — The Kinks [cancelled]
December 13 — The Zombies (imposter group)

1970
April 4 — reopened on a month to month basis under new ownership
April 11 — MC5, Snake
May 29 — Steppenwolf, Friends of Whitney Sunday
June 26 — Janis Joplin, Snake [last show, closed after this]
Promised but never appeared:
Strawberry Alarm Clock
Moby Grape
Jefferson Airplane